Osvaldo Fattoruso (12 May 1948 - 29 July 2012) was a Uruguayan musician.

He introduced rock in Latin America and created a fusion between jazz, rock and African rhythms.

He died on 29 July 2012, and is buried at the Cementerio del Norte, Montevideo.

He was the brother of Hugo Fattoruso and Sylvia Veronica Fattoruso.

References

External links 
"Trio Fattoruso"
Osvaldo Fattoruso, Duelo de Tambores.

1948 births
2012 deaths
Uruguayan musicians
20th-century Uruguayan male singers
Uruguayan jazz musicians
Latin jazz musicians
Uruguayan composers
Male composers
Jazz composers
Jazz drummers
Uruguayan guitarists
Uruguayan male guitarists
Uruguayan drummers
Male drummers
Uruguayan male musicians
Deaths from cancer in Uruguay
Burials at the Cementerio del Norte, Montevideo
Male jazz composers
Opa (Uruguayan band) members